Flanders is a 2006 French drama film, written and directed by Bruno Dumont. It tells the story of André Demester, a man whose girlfriend betrays him out of frustration with his lack of emotion. He is then sent to fight in an unnamed Middle Eastern country, where he experiences (and participates in) the horrors of war.

Plot
Running a dilapidated farm, the taciturn André leads a hard and lonely life, enlivened only by visits from Barbe, a neighbour's young daughter with whom he has quick couplings in a copse. Resenting André's lack of affection, she picks up Blondel in a bar where they are drinking and has noisy sex outside in his car. Both men are called up to fight in a Middle Eastern country, leaving Barbe pregnant.

André and Blondel's platoon go on a long patrol in the bare mountains, shooting men and children and raping a woman. They are captured by insurgents, who emasculate the rapist before shooting him and execute most of the rest. Only André and Blondel are left when a helicopter arrives overhead and the two seize the chance to flee. When Blondel is hit in the leg, André runs on alone.

Barbe meanwhile has undergone an abortion and, falling into depression, been confined in a psychiatric hospital. She is released when a traumatised André returns to run his farm. Though they have passionless sex in their old meeting place, he cannot open up to her about the horror of his experiences and his abandonment of the wounded Blondel. She gets a girl friend to try and draw out André's feelings and, after they talk, he is able to cry over the victims on both sides. Next time Barbe comes round, he confesses that he loves her and she responds.

Cast
 Adélaïde Leroux as Barbe
 Samuel Boidin as André Demester
 Henri Cretel as Blondel
 Jean-Marie Bruveart as Briche
 David Poulain as Leclercq
 Patrice Venant as Mordac
 David Legay as Lieutenant
 Inge Decaesteker as France

Awards
The film won the Grand Prix at the 2006 Cannes Film Festival.

References

External links
Official website

2006 films
2000s French-language films
Films directed by Bruno Dumont
2000s war drama films
French war drama films
2006 drama films
Cannes Grand Prix winners
2000s French films